Waltham is a village and civil parish  southwest of Canterbury in Kent, England.

History
The village was once associated with the Knights Templar and was originally called Temple Waltham.

Richard de Clare, 6th Earl of Gloucester, died at John de Criol's Manor of Asbenfield in Temple Waltham on 14 July 1262 at the age of 39; it was rumoured that he had been poisoned at the table of Piers of Savoy.

During and prior to the reign of Edward III (d. 1377), the parish of Waltham was within the hundred of Bridge. Following merger of some hundreds, by the end of the 19th century, most of the parish was within the hundred of Bridge and Petham. Of the two constables for the consolidated hundred, the current monarch was lord of the annual court leet that chose a constable for the hundred of Bridge.

Amenities
St Bartholomew's Church is Grade I listed. Its windows are of the 13th and 14th century and its tower was rebuilt and restored in 1808.

Bus 620 runs between Canterbury, Hastingleigh and Waltham.

References

External links

 Waltham Village

Villages in Kent
City of Canterbury